Plastic is a British-American action comedy-crime film directed by Julian Gilbey and co-written by Will Gilbey and Chris Howard. The film stars Ed Speleers, Will Poulter, Alfie Allen, Sebastian de Souza and Emma Rigby.  The film is purportedly based on a true story involving con-artist Saq Mumtaz.

Plot
A group of British university students are running a successful credit card scam. They make a powerful enemy by stealing his briefcase and are forced to enlist the help of Frankie, who works for a credit card company. The group of five then attempt to rack up two million pounds to pay off their debt but fall short during a night of strippers and champagne. To make up for the money they still need, they plan a diamond heist, which goes abysmally wrong.

Cast
 Ed Speleers as Sam
 Will Poulter as Fordy
 Alfie Allen as Yatesy
 Sebastian De Souza as Rafa
 Emma Rigby as Frankie
 Mem Ferda as Tariq
 Lisa Maffia as Kelly
 Malese Jow as Beth
 Amelle Berrabah as Fionna
 Thomas Kretschmann as Marcel
 Graham McTavish as Steve
 Michael Bisping as Kasper
 Robbie Gee as Mr X

Production
On 6 December 2012, Ed Speleers, Will Poulter and Alfie Allen were announced to star in the film, with Julian Gilbey set to direct and Chris Howard, Julian Gilbey and Will Gilbey set to write the film. International distribution rights are being licensed by Cinema Management Group.

Filming
On 10 December 2012, Gateway Films announced the start of principal photography of the film which was filmed in Brunei, London, Manchester and Miami.

Release
The film was released in the UK on 2 May 2014, and later released in the US on 26 September 2014.

Critical response
On review aggregator Rotten Tomatoes, the film holds an approval rating of 17% based on 30 reviews, with an average rating of 3.33/10. The website's critics consensus reads: "Far-fetched, frantically overstuffed, and unfunny, Plastic seems to use its title as a goal as much as a description."  On Metacritic, the film has a weighted average score of 32 out of 100, based on 10 critics, indicating "generally unfavorable reviews".

Guy Lodge of Variety said "The title says it all in this cheap, laborious junior heist thriller from British B-movie journeyman Julian Gilbey". Geoffrey Macnab of The Independent "A nasty streak of casual sexism runs through an already unpleasant and absurdly far-fetched film". Stephen Dalton of The Hollywood Reporter said "All champagne and strippers, conspicuous consumption and witless machismo, Plastic is a contemporary British heist movie that already feels dated, as if it were made before the bubble burst on Guy Ritchie's comic book gangster voyeurism".

There were, however, some positive reviews. Gary Goldstein of the Los Angeles Times stated that "As mindless entertainment goes, it's a pretty watchable time-passer.", and Ben Kenigsberg of The New York Times said "It's hard to escape the sense that 'Plastic' is itself a cheap knockoff, but the point is not to look too closely".

In an interview with The Guardian whilst promoting his film, The Maze Runner, actor Will Poulter expressed his disdain for starring in the film, describing the film as "bad" and saying "It’s really tough, man. Because it’s shaming. And the worst thing is thinking someone will think you did it for dishonourable reasons. I’m not shifting the blame. I recognise my responsibility to that film. But I’ve tried to shake it off since.” He closed out his interview by saying "I’ve got the one film that I regret out of my way. And I don’t intend to make another one."

References

External links 
 
 Premiere Interviews

2014 films
2014 action comedy films
2010s crime comedy films
2010s heist films
British action comedy films
British crime comedy films
British heist films
British films based on actual events
Films directed by Julian Gilbey
Films shot in London
Films shot in Miami
Gateway Films films
2014 comedy films
Films shot in Greater Manchester
2010s English-language films
2010s British films